Eve Mauro (born December 21, 1981, Atlanta, Georgia) is a Sicilian-American actress and model.

Biography
Born to a Sicilian father and a Russian mother, Mauro is the youngest of six siblings.  She moved from Orlando, Florida to Los Angeles at the age of 21 and began her acting career on stage.  Mauro's first television appearance was on the hit American series Ugly Betty.  She had a recurring role on CSI: Miami and appeared on shows such as Bones, Undercovers, It's Always Sunny in Philadelphia, CSI: NY, Dexter, Torchwood and Men of a Certain Age.

Mauro had dramatic roles besides Val Kilmer in The Chaos Experiment, and C. Thomas Howell in The Grind, both in 2009.  She worked alongside Will Ferrell and Danny McBride in the Land of the Lost and landed a role in Miss March the same year. In 2016 she starred in Cyborg X with Danny Trejo.

Filmography

References

External links

 
 
www.evemauro.com

1981 births
Living people
Female models from Georgia (U.S. state)
Actresses from Atlanta
American people of Italian descent
American people of Russian descent
American film actresses
American television actresses
21st-century American women